In combinatorial mathematics, the XYZ inequality, also called the Fishburn–Shepp inequality, is an inequality for the number of linear extensions of finite partial orders. The inequality was conjectured by Ivan Rival and Bill Sands in 1981. It was proved by Lawrence Shepp in 
.

It states that if x, y, and z are incomparable elements of a finite poset, then

,

where P(A) is the probability that a linear order extending the partial order  has the property A.

In other words, the probability that  increases if one adds the condition that .  In the language of conditional probability,

 

The proof uses the Ahlswede–Daykin inequality.

See also 
 FKG inequality

References

Inequalities
Theorems in combinatorics
Independence (probability theory)